The Northern Region is one of the sixteen regions of Ghana. It is located in the north of the country and is the second largest of the sixteen regions. Until its split, it covered an area of 70,384 square kilometres or 31 percent of Ghana's area. In  December 2018, the Savannah Region and North East Region were created from it. The Northern Region is divided into 14 districts. The region's capital is Tamale, Ghana's the largest city.

Geography and climate

Location and size
The Northern Region is bordered on the north by the North East region, on the east by the eastern Ghana-Togo international border, on the south by the Oti region, and on the west by the Savannah Region. Northern region is made up of 14 districts.

Climate and vegetation

The Northern Region is a Guinea Savanna grassland. The Guinea Savanna is the wettest of the three savanna ecological zones. The vegetation consists predominantly of  woodalnds and grasslands. Between January and March is the dry season. The wet season is between about May and October, with an average annual rainfall of 750 to 1050 mm (30 to 40 inches). The highest temperatures are reached at the end of the dry season, the lowest in December and January. However, the Harmattan wind from the Sahara blows frequently between December and the beginning of February. The temperatures can vary between 14 °C (59 °F) at night and 40 °C (104 °F) during the day.

Economy

Just like all parts of Ghana, More than half of the economically active population are agricultural.The region is one of the most agriculturally important regions in Ghana. It also has the largest reserve of iron ore.

Demographics

The Northern Region contains much of the territories of the Kingdom of Dagbon and Dagbani is the most widely spoke language, along with English. Dagbani belongs to the Oti–Volta subfamily in the Niger–Congo language family. Other languages spoken within the region include Likpakpaln and Nawuri.

Business and Investment 

The region is a hotspot for investment in Ghana, with Tamale previously been ranked as the fastest growing city in West Africa, experiencing tremendous growth compared to other cities in Ghana. The region's location, and greater proximity to both Europe and North Africa, compared to Accra, makes it an increasingly attractive destination for investors. Ghana's largest iron ore reserves, estimated to be more than three billion tonnes, makes the region an ideal destination for investments in steel and iron.

Tourist and Attraction

 Naa Gbewaa Palace, Yendi
 Hamamat Shea Butter Village
 Tamale Center for Culture and Arts
 Savanna Centre for Contemporary Art
 Red Clay Studios
 Nkrumah Volini
 Nuku Studios
 Saakpoli Slave wells
 Diarre Napagaduungbanani
 Naa Binbegu Boabab Tree, Yendi
 Buntaga Irrigation Dam
 Sabali (River Oti)
 Nawuni River (White Volta)

Religion 
Around three out of five residents in the Northern region were affiliated to Islam (60.0%).

Districts

The Northern Region of Ghana contains 16 districts. 11 are ordinary districts in addition to 1 metropolitan and 4 municipal districts.: Under every municipality, metropoly and districts are many towns and villages.

Notable Health Facilities 

 Tamale Teaching Hospital
 Tamale Central West Hospital 
 Tamale West Hospital
 SDA Hospital
 Yendi Municipal Hospital
 Savelugu Municipal Hospital
 Bimbilla District Hospital

Some famous citizens

References 

 
 GhanaDistricts.com

External links
 GhanaDistricts.com – Northern Region

 
Regions of Ghana
Dagbon